Elina Avraamovna Bystritskaya (4 April 1928 – 26 April 2019) was a Soviet and Russian stage and film actress and theater pedagogue. She is regarded as one of the most prominent actresses in the Soviet and Russian film industry. Her career spanned six decades.

Biography
Elina Avramovna Bystritskaya was born on April 4, 1928 in Kiev into a Jewish family. Her father was a physician. During World War II, she was evacuated to Astrakhan, where she studied at nursing courses. From the age of 13, worked as a nurse and laboratory assistant in front-line mobile evacuation hospital No. 3261, first in Aktyubinsk, then in Stalino and Odessa, where she lived with her mother (who worked in the same hospital).

Later she studied at the Karpenko-Karyi Theater Institute in Kiev and 
was hired by the Russian Drama Theater in Vilnius upon graduation 
in 1953. In 1958, Bystritskaia joined the troupe of Maly Theatre in Moscow where she soon became one of the leading actors.

One of her earliest roles was in Sergei Bondarchuk's and Fridrikh Ermler's Unfinished Story (1955), an archetypal Socialist Realist film. Bystritskaya was personally chosen by Soviet writer Mikhail Sholokhov to play the role of Aksinya in the film adaptation And Quiet Flows the Don (1958), over several other distinguished candidates, notably Nonna Mordyukova. In the 1960s, Bystritskaya concentrated on theatre work in the Maly Theatre and her appearances on screen grew sporadic. She was named People's Artist of the USSR in 1978.

She was President of the USSR and Russian rhythmic gymnastics Federation from 1975 to 1992.

She died on 26 April 2019 after a long illness.

Selected filmography
1950 – In Peaceful Time as Lena Alekseyenko
1951 – Taras Shevchenko as episode
1955 – Unfinished Story as Yelizaveta Muromtseva
1958 – And Quiet Flows the Don as Aksinya
1958 – Volunteers as Olga Teplova
1963 – All Remains to People as Ksenia Rumyantseva
1966 – Summer Residents as Julia Filippovna	
1967 – Nikolay Bauman as Maria Andreyeva
 1974 – Ostrovsky's House as Glafira
1991 – Seven Days After The Murder as Kira Alexandrovna	
1992 – Farewell Tour as train passenger
1993 – Brave Guys as Nadezhda
 2004 – Saga of the Ancient Bulgars as Olga of Kiev
 2006 – Muhtar's Return as Alina Stanislavovna

Honours and awards
 Order "For Merit to the Fatherland";
1st class (4 April 2008) – for outstanding contributions to the development of domestic theatrical and cinematic arts, many years of creative activity
2nd class (1 April 1998) – for outstanding contribution to the development of national culture and art
3rd class (11 October 2018) – for outstanding contribution to the development of national culture and art, many years of productive activity

 Order of the October Revolution
 Order of the Patriotic War, 2nd class (1985)
 Order of the Red Banner of Labour
 Order of the Badge of Honour, twice
 Medal "For the Victory over Germany in the Great Patriotic War 1941–1945"
 Honored Artist of the RSFSR (1964)
 People's Artist of the RSFSR (1966)
 People's Artist of the USSR (1978)
 People's Artist of the Georgian SSR
 People's Artist of the Azerbaijan SSR
 People's Artist of the Kazakh SSR
 Prize of the Russian Federation in the field of culture (2006)
 Jubilee Medal "In Commemoration of the 100th Anniversary of the Birth of Vladimir Ilyich Lenin"
 Jubilee Medal "Twenty Years of Victory in the Great Patriotic War 1941–1945"
 Jubilee Medal "Thirty Years of Victory in the Great Patriotic War 1941–1945"
 Jubilee Medal "Forty Years of Victory in the Great Patriotic War 1941–1945"
 Jubilee Medal "50 Years of Victory in the Great Patriotic War 1941–1945"
 Jubilee Medal "60 Years of Victory in the Great Patriotic War 1941–1945"
 Jubilee Medal "65 Years of Victory in the Great Patriotic War 1941–1945"
 Medal of Zhukov
 Medal "In Commemoration of the 850th Anniversary of Moscow"
 Medal "Veteran of Labour"
 A minor planet, 6180 Bystritskaya, is named after her.

References

External links

 Biography

1928 births
2019 deaths
20th-century Russian actresses
21st-century Russian actresses
Actors from Kyiv
Academicians of the National Academy of Motion Picture Arts and Sciences of Russia
Kyiv National I. K. Karpenko-Kary Theatre, Cinema and Television University alumni
Communist Party of the Soviet Union members
Honored Artists of the RSFSR
People's Artists of the RSFSR
People's Artists of the USSR
People's Artists of Azerbaijan
People's Artists of Georgia
Recipients of the Medal of Zhukov
Recipients of the Order "For Merit to the Fatherland", 1st class
Recipients of the Order "For Merit to the Fatherland", 2nd class
Recipients of the Order "For Merit to the Fatherland", 3rd class
Recipients of the Order of the Red Banner of Labour
Jewish actresses
Russian film actresses
Russian stage actresses
Soviet film actresses
Soviet stage actresses
Burials at Novodevichy Cemetery